= Onkhoyoon =

Human settlement in Yakutia, Russia

Onkhoyoon is a populated place in Yakutia, Russia.
